Harry Pearson may refer to:

Harry Pearson (cricketer) (1851–1903), English cricketer
Harry Pearson (audio critic) (1937–2014), American critic
Harry Pearson (journalist) (born 1961), English sports writer
Harry Pearson, character in Baby Love (1968 film)

See also
Harold Pearson (disambiguation) 
Henry Pearson (disambiguation)